Haarlem Stadion is a  stadium in Sportweg 8, Haarlem, Netherlands, and the home stadium of the Dutch amateur football club Haarlem Kennemerland. Formerly home of the defunct professional football club HFC Haarlem, the stadium is located in the north of Haarlem. It was built in 1907, with renovations in 1947 and during the eighties, including the replacement of the south stand, which is an all-seater stand.

Today, the stadium consists of two all-seater stands, with the east and west stands now unused since they no longer conform to the modern safety standards of today's football. The total capacity is 3,442 with 600 seats allocated to the visiting team.

References

HFC Haarlem
Football venues in the Netherlands
Sports venues in North Holland
Sports venues completed in 1907
Buildings and structures in Haarlem
1907 establishments in the Netherlands
20th-century architecture in the Netherlands